Palaverikadu is a village in the Pattukkottai taluk of Thanjavur district, Tamil Nadu, India. It is surrounded by other villages, including Athivetti, Kalyanaoodai, Krishnapuram, Parakalakottai and Odhiyadikadu. Most of the village is surrounded by coconut trees and paddy fields. "Pattukottai Coir Cluster Development Scheme" is located and run in this village. 

Most of the local population are farmers, who tend to agricultural crops such as Paddy, coconut, maize, Blackgram, Gingelly and sugarcane. Irrigations from Paatuvanachi river and from small canal from kallanai. Mostly borewells are use for agriculture purposes. The village has two large ponds: Nedungulam and Thurusalai and one small pond Pudhukulam.

Pattukottai, Madhukkur, Muthupet  and Adhirampattinam are the nearest towns. All the town are well connected by roads. There are four buses to connect nearby towns.

Festivals namely Pongal, Maatu Pongal is celebrated traditionally in grand manner and every year Pongal sports meet for our native is conducted by Palavai Youth's Club Palaverikadu. Temple festival are as follows Theradi Amman temple Sithirai thiruvila is celebrated every April and kaamandi thiruvila is one of them conducted on every February. Vinayagar chadhurthi is celebrate as well and also conduct procession around our village.

Demographics 

As of the 2001 census, Palaverikadu had a total population of 1,553 with 777 males and 776 females. The literacy rate was 80%.

References 

 

Villages in Thanjavur district